The third season of the American neo-Western television series Justified premiered on January 17, 2012, on FX, and concluded on April 10, 2012, consisting of 13 episodes. The series was developed by Graham Yost based on Elmore Leonard's novels Pronto and Riding the Rap and his short story "Fire in the Hole". Its main character is Raylan Givens, a deputy U.S. Marshal. Timothy Olyphant portrays Givens, a tough federal lawman, enforcing his own brand of justice in his Kentucky hometown. The series is set in the city of Lexington, Kentucky, and the hill country of eastern Kentucky, specifically in and around Harlan.

Plot
Season three introduces Robert Quarles (Neal McDonough), an exiled Detroit Mob player with plans to control the Oxycontin trade in Kentucky. The season begins with Raylan recovering from being shot in the standoff with the Bennetts. Boyd gets himself arrested in order to murder Dickie but stops when he learns Ellstin Limehouse (Mykelti Williamson), the protector of Noble's Holler, is holding Dickie's inheritance. Quarles allies himself with local enforcer for the Dixie Mafia Wynn Duffy (Jere Burns) and begins to muscle in on the local criminals, successfully supplanting them until Raylan begins investigating. Quarles' efforts also bring him into conflict with Boyd's group resulting in the deaths of several local individuals. The conflict between Boyd and Quarles heats up when Errol, Limehouse's lieutenant, makes it appear that Quarles attacked Boyd's own attempt to take over the Oxycontin trade. Limehouse discovers this and reluctantly agrees to make sure Boyd and Quarles destroy each other by pretending to work with both sides. Meanwhile, Raylan and Winona's relationship comes to a sudden end when Winona runs off saying Raylan cared more about the job. Raylan focuses his efforts on taking down Quarles especially after Quarles attempts to frame Raylan for the murder of Winona's ex-husband. Quarles attempts to gain the upper hand by buying off Harlan County Sheriff Napier but Boyd retaliates by running Shelby Parlow (Jim Beaver), a man who owes Boyd his life, in the election. Even though Napier wins the election, Shelby becomes Sheriff because Boyd essential rigged the outcome to disqualify Napier. With Napier out, Quarles is ruined and goes to Limehouse for protection. Limehouse agrees and attempts to play his end game to get Quarles killed and Boyd arrested by Raylan. However Boyd sees through the plan, which results in State Trooper Tom Bergen, a friend of Raylan's, getting killed. Boyd, angry at Limehouse, threatens him only for Limehouse to reveal to Raylan about a murder Boyd committed. Quarles makes a desperation deal with Theo Tonin (Adam Arkin), the head of the Detroit Mob, to come home and attempts to rob Limehouse but Limehouse slices his arm off. Raylan accuses Quarles of killing Bergen only for Quarles to laugh and reveal Arlo killed Bergen. Arlo confesses to his crimes and confesses to the crimes Boyd is accused of which sets Boyd free. The season ends with Raylan confiding in Winona that he's not sure if Arlo shot the Trooper to protect Boyd or because he simply saw a cop in a hat. Other stories include Dickie's own attempts claim his inheritance from Limehouse only to eventually learn Loretta McCready was given the money as part of Mags's final wishes and Ava becomes a larger part of Boyd's empire by taking over a local brothel after killing an abusive pimp.

Cast and characters

Main
 Timothy Olyphant as Deputy U.S. Marshal Raylan Givens
 Nick Searcy as Chief Deputy U.S. Marshal Art Mullen
 Joelle Carter as Ava Crowder
 Jacob Pitts as Deputy U.S. Marshal Tim Gutterson
 Erica Tazel as Deputy U.S. Marshal Rachel Brooks
 Natalie Zea as Winona Hawkins
 Walton Goggins as Boyd Crowder

Recurring

Guest
 Richard Speight Jr. as Jed Berwind
 Steven Flynn as Emmitt Arnett
 Linda Gehringer as Helen Givens
 James LeGros as Wade Messer

Production
The third season of 13 episodes was announced on March 29, 2011.

Filming
Episodes were shot in California. The small town of Green Valley, California often doubles for Harlan, Kentucky.

Episodes

Reception
On Rotten Tomatoes, the season has an approval rating of 96% with an average score of 9.6 out of 10 based on 28 reviews. The website's critical consensus reads, "Justified continues to dispense its brand of spare dialogue and sudden violence, culminating in a very satisfying finale." On Metacritic, the season has a weighted average score of 89 out of 100, based on 14 critics, indicating "universal acclaim.

Robert Bianco of USA Today praised this season, writing: "As you'd hope from a show based on Elmore Leonard's work, the plots snap, the dialogue crackles and—to press on with the point—the characters pop." Verne Gay of Newsday said of the third season, "Lean, laconic, precise and as carefully word-crafted as any series on TV, there's pretty much nothing here to suggest that the third season won't be as good as the second -- or better." However, Emily Nussbaum of The New Yorker was critical of the third season, writing: "Extended storytelling has its own conventions and clichés, all of which appeared in Season 3... it echoed every cable drama, in the worst way."

Awards
Justified received two nominations for the 64th Primetime Emmy Awards, with Jeremy Davies winning for Outstanding Guest Actor in a Drama Series, and a nomination for Outstanding Art Direction for a Single-Camera Series. Fred Golan was nominated for an Edgar Allan Poe Award for Best Episode in a TV Series for "Slaughterhouse".

Ratings
The third season averaged 2.391 million viewers and a 0.9 rating in the 18–49 demographic.

Home media release
The third season was released on Blu-ray and DVD in region 1 on December 31, 2012, in region 2 on February 25, 2013, and in region 4 on March 6, 2013. Special features on the season three set include nine audio commentaries by cast and crew, deleted scenes, four behind-the-scenes featurettes, and outtakes.

References

External links

 

03
2012 American television seasons